Sahana Pradhan (Nepali: साहाना प्रधान) (17 June 1927 – 22 September 2014) was a Nepalese politician from a Newar family in Kathmandu. She resigned as Minister of Foreign Affairs of Nepal on April 16, 2008. She also served as Deputy Prime Minister of Nepal within the coalition government of Prime Minister Girija Prasad Koirala from 2007 to 2008.

Pradhan was married to communist stalwart Pushpa Lal Shrestha, and was a leading figure in his Communist Party of Nepal. When Pushpa Lal died in 1978, Balaram Upadhyaya became party leader. In 1986 Pradhan became the leader of the party. In 1987 the party merged with Manmohan Adhikari's faction, forming the Communist Party of Nepal (Marxist)

When the CPN(UML) was divided in 1998, Pradhan sided with the break-away faction. She became chairperson of Communist Party of Nepal (Marxist-Leninist). However, in 2002 CPN(ML) merged back into CPN(UML).

At the 2003 7th conference of CPN(UML), Pradhan was reelected to the Central Committee.

Pradhan was the number two candidate of CPN(UML) in the proportional representation list for the April 2008 Constituent Assembly election.

Died 
Sahara pradhan died of a brain hemorrhage on 22 September 2014 at the age of 87 in the Vayodha Hospital in Kathmandu.

References

1927 births
2014 deaths
Deputy Prime Ministers of Nepal
Foreign Ministers of Nepal
Government ministers of Nepal
Communist Party of Nepal (Pushpa Lal) politicians
Communist Party of Nepal (Marxist) (1986–1991) politicians
Communist Party of Nepal (Marxist–Leninist) (1998) politicians
Communist Party of Nepal (Unified Marxist–Leninist) politicians
21st-century Nepalese women politicians
21st-century Nepalese politicians
People from Kathmandu
Newar people
Female foreign ministers
Nepal MPs 1991–1994
Nepal MPs 1994–1999
20th-century Nepalese women politicians
20th-century Nepalese politicians